Bridge and Tunnel was an American punk band from Huntington, New York.

History
Bridge and Tunnel began in 2008, releasing a split with the band Young Livers. Bridge and Tunnel also released their first full-length album in 2008 on No Idea Records titled East/West. In 2009, Bridge and Tunnel released a 7" titled Loss Leaders on Yo-Yo Records. In 2010, Bridge and Tunnel released a 10" titled Indoor Voices. In 2011, Bridge and Tunnel released a 7" titled Homecoming. Also in 2011, Bridge and Tunnel released their second and final full-length album on No Idea Records titled Rebuilding Year.

Band members
Alison Fair
Jeff Cunningham
Pat Schramm
Rachel Rubino
Tia Meilinger

References

Musical groups from New York City
2008 establishments in New York City
Musical groups established in 2008